Handbook on history of Ukraine (Історія України) is a multi-volume comprehensive encyclopedic book about the history of Ukraine. There were at least two editions published by Kyiv publisher "Geneza" which specializes in publishing school handbooks. The first edition was published in 1993–99, the second in 1999. The authors of the handbook are Ihor Pidkova and Roman Shust. The web version also provides electronic copies of Ukrainian historical outlines from such Ukrainian historians like Natalia Yakovenko and Yaroslav Hrytsak.

See also

 Encyclopedia of Ukraine
 Encyclopedia of Modern Ukraine

References

External links
 Main page . Electronic (web) version.

Ukrainian encyclopedias
Ukrainian studies
History books about Ukraine
Ukrainian-language encyclopedias
20th-century encyclopedias
Ukrainian-language books